Lorton may refer to:
 Lorton, Cumbria, United Kingdom
 Lorton, Nebraska
 Lorton, Virginia
Lorton station, an Amtrak Auto Train station in Lorton, Virginia
Lorton (VRE station), a Virginia Railway Express station in Lorton, Virginia